This is a list of the number-one songs from 1989 to 2005 in Panama. The charts are compiled by United Press International (from 1989 to 1996) and Notimex (from 1998 to 2005); and published by Mexican newspaper El Siglo de Torreón.

1989

1990

1991

1992

1993

1994

1995

1996

1998

1999

2000

2002

2003

2004

2005

References 

Panamanian music-related lists